The Minnesota Wrecking Crew was originally a professional wrestling tag team that was formed by Gene and Lars Anderson but since then has featured a number of wrestlers who wrestled under the Anderson family name despite not being blood related.

History
Gene Anderson formed the original Minnesota Wrecking Crew with Lars Anderson in 1966. They wrestled throughout the country in the late 60s until Lars left to live in Hawaii. In 1969 Gene then brought in Alan Rogowski, and renamed him Ole Anderson. They dominated tag team wrestling in the 1970s, winning the NWA World Tag Team Titles 8 times. Over those years, Lars Anderson was on occasion brought back in as part of this team.

When Gene stopped wrestling in 1981 to manage, the team was disbanded.

In 1985, Ole reformed the Crew with Arn Anderson (his kayfabe nephew) as his partner. They won the NWA National Tag Team Titles and were members of the original Four Horsemen as the Wrecking Crew. They disbanded in 1987 when Ole was kicked out of the Horsemen.

Arn and Ole revived the Wrecking Crew in 1990 but it lasted for only a few months before Ole retired.

Also in 1990, Ole managed the Minnesota Wrecking Crew 2 in NWA while Arn was out injured. This team consisted of Mike Enos and Wayne Bloom. Both members were from Minnesota and wore masks. The two men had previously been AWA World Tag Team Champions, but were beaten by NWA World Tag Team Champions Rick and Scott Steiner in the NWA.

Legacy
In 2001 in Ohio Valley Wrestling, Brock Lesnar and Shelton Benjamin (once teammates on the University of Minnesota wrestling team) formed the Minnesota Stretching Crew in honor of the Wrecking Crew.
More recently, independent women wrestlers Lacey and Rain have used the name Minnesota Home Wrecking Crew in homage to the Andersons' classic tag team.

The Canadian sketch comedy troupe The Minnesota Wrecking Crew are also named in honor of the original MWC tag team.

Championships and accomplishments
National Wrestling Alliance
 NWA Hall of Fame (class of 2010)

Lars and Gene
Mid-South Sports
NWA Georgia Tag Team Championship (2 times)
NWA World Tag Team Championship (Georgia version) (1 time)

Gene and Ole
Georgia Championship Wrestling
NWA Columbus Tag Team Championship (11 times)
NWA Georgia Tag Team Championship (7 times)
NWA Macon Tag Team Championship (1 time)
NWA World Tag Team Championship (Georgia version) (1 times)
Mid-Atlantic Championship Wrestling
NWA Atlantic Coast Tag Team Championship (3 times)
NWA Mid-Atlantic Tag Team Championship (2 times)
NWA World Tag Team Championship (Mid-Atlantic version) (7 times)
Pro Wrestling Illustrated
Tag Team of the Year (1975, 1977)

Ole and Arn
Jim Crockett Promotions
NWA National Tag Team Championship (1 time)
Pro Wrestling Illustrated
Ranked Ole and Arn Anderson No. 79 of the best 100 tag teams during the PWI Years in 2003

See also
The Brain Busters
The Enforcers

References

Anderson family
Independent promotions teams and stables
Jim Crockett Promotions teams and stables
National Wrestling Alliance teams and stables